Rebirth is a 2016 American thriller film written and directed by Karl Mueller. The film stars Fran Kranz, Adam Goldberg, Nicky Whelan, Kat Foster, Andrew J. West and Eric Ladin. The film was released on July 15, 2016, on Netflix.

Plot
A white-collar suburban father Kyle (Fran Kranz) is surprised at his office by long-lost college buddy Zack (Adam Goldberg). Zack is as wild and crazy as ever, brimming with excitement about the self-actualization program he's just finished called Rebirth. He talks Kyle into going on a weekend-long Rebirth retreat, handing over his keys, wallet, and phone. Thus begins his journey down a bizarre rabbit hole of psychodrama, seduction, and violence.

Cast

Fran Kranz as Kyle
Adam Goldberg as Zack
Nicky Whelan as Naomi
Kat Foster as Mary
Andrew J. West as J.R.
Eric Ladin as Todd
Steve Agee as Ray
Luis Gerardo Méndez as Doctor
Pat Healy as Jesse
Harry Hamlin as Gabe
Kevin Bigley as Chad
Tom Wright as The Expert
Aynsley Bubbico as Abby
Fabianne Therese as Betty
Nathalie Autumn Bennett as Rhonda
Kevin Burns as Meth
Sheryl Lee as Air

Release
The film premiered at the Tribeca Film Festival on April 17, 2016. The film was released on July 15, 2016, on Netflix.

References

External links
 

2016 films
2016 thriller films
American thriller films
English-language Netflix original films
2010s English-language films
2010s American films